Strandlandet Church is a parish church of the Church of Norway in Vågan Municipality in Nordland county, Norway. It is located in the village of Straumnes on the northwestern part of the island of Austvågøya. It is the church for the Strandlandet parish which is part of the Lofoten prosti (deanery) in the Diocese of Sør-Hålogaland. The white, wooden church was built in a long church style in 1938 using plans drawn up by the architect Sverre Pettersen. The church seats about 250 people and originally it was built to serve the eastern part of the old Gimsøy Municipality.

See also
List of churches in Sør-Hålogaland

References

Vågan
Churches in Nordland
Wooden churches in Norway
20th-century Church of Norway church buildings
Churches completed in 1938
1938 establishments in Norway
Long churches in Norway